The 1938–39 Gauliga Ostmark was the inaugural season of the Gauliga Ostmark and organized by the National Socialist League of the Reich for Physical Exercise, the organizing body for sports in Nazi Germany. In March 1938, Nazi Germany annexed Austria in what is commonly referred to as the Anschluss, with the Gauliga Ostmark formed as a consequence. Austria and the Austrian football championship thereby ceased to exist until the end of the Second World War.

SK Admira Wien won the championship and qualified for the 1939 German football championship where it lost 9–0 in the final to FC Schalke 04.

The Gauliga Ostmark and Gauliga Donau-Alpenland titles from 1938 to 1944, excluding the 1944–45 season which was not completed, are recognised as official Austrian football championships by the Austrian Bundesliga.

Table
The 1938–39 season saw four new clubs in the league, SV Amateure Fiat, Grazer SC, SK Amateure Steyr and Reichsbahn Wacker Wiener Neustadt.

Results

References

External links
 Das Deutsche Fussball Archiv  Historic German league tables

Gauliga Ostmark seasons
Austria
1
1938–39 in German football leagues